Courageous Exploits of Doctor Syn is the fifth in the series of Doctor Syn novels by Russell Thorndike. Like the previous volume it is an episodic collection of adventures.  It follows Syn's adventures in his guise as the Scarecrow of Romney Marsh as he foils all attempts to catch him and to break up the Dymchurch smugglers.

Courageous Exploits of Doctor Syn was published in 1939. It follows the events of Further Adventures of Doctor Syn and is followed by Amazing Quest of Doctor Syn.

1939 British novels
British historical novels
Novels set in Kent
Novels by Russell Thorndike
Rich & Cowan books